Dium or Dion was a town of ancient Crete. Pliny the Elder speaks of it as an inland town. However, Ptolemy discusses a promontory on the north coast of Crete, at its greatest breadth, called Dium Promontorium (Δίον ἄκρον - Dion akron), leading some to suppose a connection to the town.

References

Populated places in ancient Crete
Former populated places in Greece
Lost ancient cities and towns